The following lists events that happened during 1869 in South Africa.

Incumbents
 Governor of the Cape of Good Hope and High Commissioner for Southern Africa: Sir Philip Wodehouse.
 Lieutenant-governor of the Colony of Natal: Robert William Keate.
 State President of the Orange Free State: Jan Brand.
 State President of the South African Republic: Marthinus Wessel Pretorius.

Events
September
 4 – The first rails of the Namaqualand Railway is laid.

Births
 2 October – Mahatma Gandhi, Indian activist and politician. (d. 1948)

Deaths

Railways

New lines
 Construction begins on the Port Nolloth-O'okiep line.

References

South Africa
Years in South Africa
History of South Africa